Kampemba is a commune of the city of Lubumbashi in the Democratic Republic of the Congo.

Populated places in Haut-Katanga Province
Democratic Republic of Congo geography articles needing translation from French Wikipedia
Communes of the Democratic Republic of the Congo